Odd Inge Olsen (born 28 December 1969) is a former footballer who played for Molde FK 1997-2001, and Rosenborg BK 2001-2004. He also represented the Norway national team on two occasions in 1997.

Olsen played midfield and defence, but also scored a hat-trick when Molde won 4–0 against Brann in the 97/98 season.

References

External links 
Olsen at RBKweb.no

Norwegian footballers
Rosenborg BK players
Molde FK players
Eliteserien players
1969 births
Living people
Association football midfielders
Association football defenders
Norway international footballers